Frank Kechele (born 3 September 1986 in Nördlingen, Bavaria) is a German racing driver. He has competed in such series as Eurocup Formula Renault 2.0. He won the Formula Renault 2.0 Northern European Cup in 2007 for Motopark Academy by winning eight races and beating Tobias Hegewald and Valtteri Bottas to the title.

Complete GT1 World Championship results

References

External links
 Official website
 Career statistics from Driver Database

1986 births
Living people
People from Nördlingen
Sportspeople from Swabia (Bavaria)
German racing drivers
Nordic Formula Renault 2.0 drivers
Dutch Formula Renault 2.0 drivers
German Formula Renault 2.0 drivers
Formula Renault Eurocup drivers
Formula Renault 2.0 NEC drivers
FIA GT1 World Championship drivers
Racing drivers from Bavaria
Blancpain Endurance Series drivers
ADAC GT Masters drivers
24 Hours of Spa drivers

Abt Sportsline drivers
Motopark Academy drivers
24H Series drivers
Porsche Carrera Cup Germany drivers